María Angélica Bernal Villalobos (born 27 March 1995) is a Colombian wheelchair tennis player who competes in international level events. She is a multiple Parapan American Games medalist and has competed in the Paralympic Games twice.

Bernal has phocomelia and was born without her right leg and uses a prosthetic since she was two years old. She played wheelchair tennis aged eleven when she was inspired by Esther Vergeer and Maria Sharapova. She participated at the 2020 US Open for the first time and was a semifinalist in both the wheelchair women's singles and doubles events.

References

External links
 
 

1995 births
Living people
Sportspeople from Bogotá
Paralympic wheelchair tennis players of Colombia
Wheelchair tennis players at the 2012 Summer Paralympics
Wheelchair tennis players at the 2016 Summer Paralympics
21st-century Colombian women